The 2013–14 FA Women's Cup is the 43rd season of the FA Women's Cup, the main domestic knockout Cup competition in English women's football. Arsenal are the defending champions and the final will be played at Stadium mk.

First round

Chester-Le-Street Town 0-1 Tranmere Rovers
Middlesbrough 3-2 Sheffield United
Whitley Bay 2-1 Brighouse Town
Chorley 1-6 Huddersfield Town
Blackpool Wren Rovers 1-0 Hull City
Liverpool Feds 6-0 Peterlee St. Francis
TNS 4-0 Sandiacre Town
FC Reedswood 2-1(aet) Leicester City Ladies
Loughborough Students 5-2 Cambridge Women
Copsewood 1-0 Nettleham
Loughborough Foxes 1-3(aet) Milton Keynes Dons
Crystal Palace 2-0 Maidenhead United
C&K Basildon 2-1 KIKK United
Bedford H/W Westfield
Leverstock Green 0-5 Queens Park Rangers
Ebbsfleet United 2-5(aet) Denham United
Enfield Town 3-2 Norwich City
Exeter City 3-1 Gosport Borough
Forest Green Rovers 0-1 St.Nicholas
Plymouth Argyle H/W University of Portsmouth
Larkhall Athletic 3-0 Swindon Spitfires
Chichester City 6-0 Gloucester City

Second round

TNS 0-7 Stoke City
FC Reedswood P-P Copsewood
Loughborough Students 1-4 Leeds United
Preston North End P-P Sporting Club Albion
Huddersfield Town 1-4 Coventry City
Derby County P-P Newcastle United
Middlesbrough P-P Tranmere Rovers
Nottingham Forest 3-0 Wolverhampton Wanderers
Whitley Bay 0-1 Blackburn Rovers
Sheffield FC P-P Liverpool Feds
Bradford City P-P Blackpool Wren Rovers
Chichester City P-P Enfield Town
Lewes 1-0(aet) Denham United
Portsmouth P-P Keynsham Town
Charlton Athletic P-P Milton Keynes Dons
Queens Park Rangers 1-2(aet) Gillingham
Chesham United 1-2 Larkhall Athletic
Exeter City P-P Plymouth Argyle
C&K Basildon P-P West Ham United
Brighton & Hove Albion 3-2 Tottenham Hotspur
Cardiff City LFC 3-0 St.Nicholas
Bedford 2-3 Crystal Palace

Third round
Entering are 10 WSL 2 teams, they are joined by 22 winners of the second round.

Plymouth Argyle P-P Brighton & Hove Albion
Charlton Athletic P-P Sheffield FC
Nottingham Forest P-P Gillingham
Portsmouth 3-0 Lewes
Durham WFC 4-0 Chichester City
Crystal Palace P-P Derby County
Coventry City 3-1 Stoke City
Leeds United P-P London Bees
Blackburn Rovers P-P Middlesbrough
Copsewood 3-2(aet) Larkhall Athletic
Aston Villa 0-2 Doncaster Rovers Belles
Millwall Lionesses P-P Reading
Sunderland 5-1 Oxford United

4th round

Cardiff City LFC 1-0(aet) London Bees 
Coventry City 2-0 Brighton & Hove Albion
Sunderland 4-1 Watford
Gillingham 1-0 Preston North End
Reading 2-0(aet) Blackburn Rovers
Crystal Palace 2-3 Portsmouth
Durham 3-1 Sheffield FC
Doncaster Rovers Belles 4-1 Copsewood

5th round
Entering this round are the eight WSL 1 teams, they join eight winners of the fourth round. Played on 13 April 2014.

Manchester City 2-1 Reading
Notts County 2-1 Coventry City
Arsenal 2-0 Gillingham
Birmingham City 3-1 Doncaster Rovers Belles
Portsmouth 2-1 Durham
Chelsea 2-1 (aet) Bristol Academy
Cardiff City 1-3 Everton
Sunderland 0-2 Liverpool

6th round
The 6th round, also known as the quarter finals, draw was made on 14 April 2014. The matches will be played on Sunday 27 April unless the clubs agree otherwise. The winners advance into the semi finals and receive £1,000 in prize money. Seven teams play in the WSL 1, Portsmouth Ladies play in the Women’s Premier 2nd Level, which is the fourth level.

Semi finals
The draw for the semi finals was made on 14 April, with the venues for the matches to be decided at a later date. The matches will be played on 11 May. Only WSL 1 teams remain. On 30 April the FA announced that Woking’s Kingfield Stadium and Alfreton’s Impact Arena will host the matches.

Final

On 15 February 2014, the FA announced that the final would be held at Stadium mk and will kick off at 16:30 on 1 June. In May 2014 Martin Atkinson was named the referee for the final with Lindsey Robinson and Mark Dwyer as assistants with Rebecca Welch serving as the fourth official. The match was broadcast live on BBC Two.

References

External links
FA website
Cup season at soccerway.com

Women's FA Cup seasons
Cup